Volinus is a genus of scarab beetles in the family Scarabaeidae. This genus has a single species, Volinus sticticus. It is found in Europe and Asia.

References

External links

 

Scarabaeidae
Monotypic Scarabaeidae genera
Beetles of Asia
Beetles of Europe
Taxa named by Étienne Mulsant